The Communauté de communes Plateau de Caux-Doudeville-Yerville is a communauté de communes in the Seine-Maritime département and in the Normandy région of France. It was formed on 1 January 2017 by the merger of the former Communauté de communes d'Yerville-Plateau de Caux and Communauté de communes Plateau de Caux-Fleur de Lin on 1 January 2017. It consists of 40 communes, and its seat is in Doudeville. Its area is 252.6 km2. Its population was 21,005 in 2018.

Composition
The communauté de communes consists of the following 40 communes:

Amfreville-les-Champs
Ancretiéville-Saint-Victor
Anvéville
Auzouville-l'Esneval
Bénesville
Berville-en-Caux
Boudeville
Bourdainville
Bretteville-Saint-Laurent
Butot
Canville-les-Deux-Églises
Carville-Pot-de-Fer
Cideville
Criquetot-sur-Ouville
Doudeville
Ectot-l'Auber
Ectot-lès-Baons
Étalleville
Étoutteville
Flamanville
Fultot
Gonzeville
Grémonville
Harcanville
Héricourt-en-Caux
Hugleville-en-Caux
Lindebeuf
Motteville
Ouville-l'Abbaye
Prétot-Vicquemare
Reuville
Robertot
Routes
Saint-Laurent-en-Caux
Saint-Martin-aux-Arbres
Saussay
Le Torp-Mesnil
Vibeuf
Yerville
Yvecrique

References 

Plateau de Caux-Doudeville-Yerville
Plateau de Caux-Doudeville-Yerville